Adelaide Sophia Hoodless (née Addie Hunter; February 27, 1858 – February 26, 1910) was a Canadian educational reformer who founded the international women's organization known as the Women's Institute. She was the second president of the Hamilton, Ontario Young Women's Christian Association (YWCA), holding the position from 1890–1902. She maintained important ties to the business community of Hamilton and achieved great political and public attention through her work.

Early life and education
Adelaide Hunter was born on a farm in St George, Canada West (now Ontario), the youngest of twelve children. Her father died a few months after her birth on October 13, 1858. Her mother, Jane Hamilton Hunter, was left to manage the farm and a large household. Perhaps the hard work and isolation of her youth inspired Hoodless to take up the cause of domestic reform years later.

After her years in a one-room schoolhouse, she stayed with her sister Lizzie while attending 'Ladies College' in Brantford, Ontario. While there, she met John Hoodless who was also the close friend of her sister Lizzie's future husband, Seth Charlton. John Hoodless was the only surviving son of a successful Hamilton furniture manufacturer (Joseph Hoodless). She married John Hoodless on September 14, 1881, and moved to Hamilton, Ontario.

Career
As she entered a more public life, she exchanged the name 'Addie' for 'Adelaide'.  She also exchanged her life as a hard-working girl in a full and busy rural farmhouse for the life of a Victorian socialite.  Adelaide and John had four children: Edna, Muriel, Bernard (Bernie) and John Harold.

Then personal tragedy struck: on August 10, 1889, her infant son John Harold died at the age of 14 months – from what has been attributed to as "summer complaint" but his death register states his cause of death as meningitis following an illness of 10 days duration.

Adelaide was devastated. Her mother, Jane Hamilton Hunter, who had managed the farm where Adelaide grew up after the death of Addie's father David in 1857, had died only one year before on August 26, 1888—just after John Harold's birth on June 23, 1888. It was after her son's death that Adelaide's public life began.  She wanted to ensure that women had the knowledge to prevent deaths like those of her child and she devoted herself to the betterment of education for new mothers.

She became the second president of the Hamilton branch of the Young Women's Christian Association (YWCA) in 1890, a role she used to work towards the establishment of domestic science education, and taught classes in domestic science (home economics). Hoodless is credited with being the founder of the Canadian National YWCA in 1895.

In January 1897, the Minister of Education asked Adelaide to write a textbook for Domestic Science courses.  In 1898 she published a book Public School Domestic Science.  This became known as the 'Little Red Book'.  It stressed the importance of hygiene, cleanliness and frugality.

In addition to these projects, Adelaide travelled all over the province, speaking on the subject of domestic science.  She was a lively and engaging speaker and between 1894 and 1898 she gave 60 addresses.

Erland Lee, of Stoney Creek, heard Adelaide speak, and her message resonated with him. He asked Adelaide to speak at his Farmer's Institute Ladies Night meeting, on Feb 12th, 1897.  When she spoke that night, she suggested forming a group with a purpose to broaden the knowledge of domestic science and agriculture as well as to socialize. This group was to become the first branch of the Women's Institute, with Adelaide as honorary president and Christina Ann Smith as president.  Within a decade more than 500 branches been organized across Canada.

Adelaide had met Lady Aberdeen through her work with the National Council for Women.  Now concerned about families living in isolated surroundings with little or no access to medical care, Lady Aberdeen sought Adelaide's support.  Her own campaign merged nicely with this goal.  Adelaide worked with Lady Aberdeen to found the National Council of Women of Canada, the Victorian Order of Nurses and the National Association of the YWCA.

By Oct of 1902, the Ministry of Education was about to make domestic science a regular part of the curriculum in Ontario schools but Adelaide already had her sights on the next step.  She wanted Domestic Science to be offered at the university level.  She also knew she needed a wealthy patron to finance the project.  She approached Sir William Christopher Macdonald, a wealthy Montreal non-smoker, who had made his money in tobacco. Her Ontario Normal School of Domestic Science and Art in Hamilton became the MacDonald Institute of Home Economics which became part of the University of Guelph. In 1907, the Women's Institute marked its 10th anniversary by commissioning Toronto artist John Wycliffe Lowes Forster to paint her portrait. The painting was donated to the MacDonald Institute.

On February 26, 1910, Adelaide travelled by train to Toronto to speak at St. Margaret's College on "Women and Industrial Life". Adelaide Hunter Hoodless's death was registered as the result of heart failure. She was buried in Hamilton, March 1, 1910. Having died one day before her 52nd birthday.

Legacy
Adelaide Hoodless is credited as a co-founder of the Women's Institutes, the National Council of Women of Canada, the Victorian Order of Nurses and the YWCA in Canada. She was a major force behind the formation of three faculties of Household Science. All of these organizations are in existence today.

The Victorian Order of Nurses is a Canadian not-for-profit home-care organization operating in Ontario and Nova Scotia. With a staff of more than 6,400 and supported by more than 6,200 volunteers, it is a daily presence in the lives of many Canadians.

There are Councils of Women in 20 cities, in 5 provinces, along with 27 affiliate organizations.  The National Council of Women has met formally with the members of the federal Cabinet since 1924 to advocate for policies developed through a grassroots process of consultation and debate.

The Women's Institute, internationally organized through the Associated Country Women of the World, has a membership of over 9 million member societies in over 70 countries.

In 1911, the year after she died, one of Hamilton's new schools was named after her.  Her beloved husband, John, laid the cornerstone.  There are also schools named after her in Bridgeworth, and Blaine, Ontario.

On October 27, 1937, a cairn dedicated to Hoodless' memory was unveiled by Lady Tweedsmuir in St. George, Ontario.

In 1975, Dr. Henry Heard Marshall at Agriculture and Agri-Food Canada developed the 'Adelaide Hoodless rose' named after her.

In 1993, Canada Post issued a postage stamp to commemorate Hoodless. It features a portrait of Hoodless drawn by artist Heather Cooper.

In 2003, the Hoodless Garden, was created as a part of numerous celebrations to mark the 100th anniversary of the founding of the MacDonald Institute in Guelph, Ontario.  A sculpture by artist Jan Noestheden takes the form of a larger-than-life aluminum portrait, mounted 6" away from the wall, so light will shine through the image and cast a shadow.

Hoodless' childhood home in St George, Ontario, was acquired by the Federated Women's Institutes of Canada (FWIC) in 1959. It was renovated and styled to reflect the time period when Hoodless lived there. In 1995 it was designated a National Historic Site and now operates as a museum.

References

External links
 Biography at the Dictionary of Canadian Biography Online
 
 
 www.adelaidehoodless.ca
 

1857 births
1910 deaths
Canadian activists
People from the County of Brant
Persons of National Historic Significance (Canada)
Canadian women activists
Textbook writers
19th-century Canadian non-fiction writers
19th-century Canadian women writers